Dearnaley is a surname. Notable people with the surname include:

George Dearnaley (born 1969), South African soccer player
Irvine Dearnaley (1877–1965), British cricketer

See also
Dearnley

Surnames of English origin